The Abadia Retuerta is a Spanish winery founded in . The estate is situated just outside the border of the Ribera del Duero region in Spain's north central province of Castilla y León, near the village of Sardón del Duero. Twenty miles east of the city of Valladolid, it lies in wine estates stretching from Tudela de Duero to Peñafiel known as “the golden mile”. Notably, it is just a few miles from Vega Sicilia, producer of Unico (wine).

Property 
Soil composition is heterogeneous, with sand, clay and some gravel near the river and limestone scattered with aggregate boulders and stone on the upper reaches of the hillside. The climate is extreme continental and semi-desert, with hot summers, cold winters and average annual rainfall of 300 mm to 450 mm. Being outside of the DO Ribera del Duero allows them to use drip irrigation when needed. The 54 vineyard plots take up 206 hectares (HA); 146 of which is planted with Tempranillo, 40 HA with Cabernet Sauvignon, 16 HA with Merlot, 2 HA with Syrah and 2 HA with Petit Verdot.

Facilities and winemakers 
The wine making facilities were designed by consulting oenologist Pascal Delbeck, proprietor of Château Ausone, who still works with the estate along with Angel Anocíbar. The winery is conceived around a gravity flow system and features a laboratory and an aging cellar of 5,000-barrel capacity cut into the adjacent mountainside. The wines can be aged in the 80 stainless steel vats, or any combination of the 3,700 Bordeaux-type 225-litre barrels, which are 80% French oak, 20% American oak. Of the French oak, some are derived from Limousin forests, while others are cut from Allier trees. Humidity and temperature are maintained at optimum levels for the wines’ development.

Wines 
Abadía Retuerta's wines are all produced under the Vino de la Tierra de Castilla y León appellation. Production as of 2006 is 85,000 9-liter cases a year.

References

Wineries of Spain
Wine brands